Clovis Hugues (November 3, 1851 – June 11, 1907) was a French poet, journalist, dramatist, novelist, and socialist activist.

Life
Born in Ménerbes (Vaucluse) to the family of a miller, he studied for the priesthood in Carpentras, but did not take orders.  For some articles favorable to the Paris Commune, published in the local papers of Marseille, he was condemned in 1871 to three years' imprisonment and a fine of 6,000 francs. In 1877 he married the sculptor Jeanne Royannez (1851-1907). In 1877 he fought a duel in which he killed his adversary, a rival journalist.

Elected deputy by Marseille in the general elections of 1881, he was at that time the sole representative of the French Workers' Party in the chambers. He was re-elected in 1885, and in 1893 became one of the deputies for Paris, retaining his seat until 1906. He died in Paris.

His poems, novels and comedies are full of wit and exuberant vitality.

Works

Poetry
Poèmes de prison (1875), written during his detention
Soirs de bataille (1883)
Jours de combat (1883)
Le Travail (1889)

Novels
Madame Phaëton (1885)
Monsieur le gendarme (1891)

Dramas
Une Étoile (1888)
Le sommeil de Danton (1888)

References

Jean-Claude Izzo, Clovis Hugues, un rouge du Midi, Éditions Jeanne Laffitte, 1978, 2001.
Gustave Kahn, Clovis Hugues, H. Fabre, Paris, 1910.

External links
 
Full bibliography
Illustrated biography (in Provençal).
Ode au vagin - a 1901 erotic poem by Clovis Hughes
Clovis Hugues, an 1884 poem by Théodore de Banville

1851 births
1907 deaths
People from Vaucluse
Politicians from Provence-Alpes-Côte d'Azur
French Workers' Party politicians
Members of the 3rd Chamber of Deputies of the French Third Republic
Members of the 4th Chamber of Deputies of the French Third Republic
Members of the 6th Chamber of Deputies of the French Third Republic
Members of the 7th Chamber of Deputies of the French Third Republic
Members of the 8th Chamber of Deputies of the French Third Republic
19th-century French journalists
French male journalists
19th-century French novelists
20th-century French novelists
Occitan poets
French male poets
French male novelists
19th-century poets
19th-century French dramatists and playwrights
19th-century French male writers
20th-century French male writers